The Old Burying Ground, or Old Burial Ground, is a historic cemetery in Cambridge, Massachusetts, United States, located just outside in Harvard Square.

The cemetery opened in 1635.

Notable burials
 Jonathan Belcher – colonial American merchant, businessman, and politician (Governor of Massachusetts Bay)
 Jonathan Remington – colonial American jurist (associate justice Massachusetts Supreme Judicial Court)
 Edmund Trowbridge – colonial American jurist (associate justice Massachusetts Supreme Judicial Court)
 Daniel Gookin – early settler and worker with Native Americans
 Cicely – enslaved servant of a Harvard tutor (the oldest surviving gravestone of a Black person in the Americas)

Several early Presidents of Harvard College are buried here including:
 John Leverett the Younger – President of Harvard College 1708–24
 John Rogers – President of Harvard College 1682–84

Cato Stedman and Neptune Frost black soldiers of the Continental Army 1775. Commemorated on a blue sign on the fence of The Old Burying Ground, Sage Street.

References

External links
 
 
 

1635 establishments in Massachusetts
Buildings and structures in Cambridge, Massachusetts
Cemeteries in Middlesex County, Massachusetts
Tourist attractions in Cambridge, Massachusetts